Sven-Sören Christophersen (born 9 May 1985) is a former German handball player. He competed at the 2008 Summer Olympics in Beijing, where the German team placed 9th.

References

1985 births
Living people
Sportspeople from Lübeck
German male handball players
Olympic handball players of Germany
Handball players at the 2008 Summer Olympics
HSG Wetzlar players